Splendid may refer to:

HMS Splendid, four ships of the British Royal Navy
Splendid Geyser, Yellowstone National Park, United States
Splendid (musical duo), Australian indie pop duo
Splendid, a character in the Flash cartoon series Happy Tree Friends

Locations
Hotel Splendid, Bečići, Montenegro
Le Splendid, a Parisian café-théâtre company founded in the 1970s